Joseph Copley may refer to:

Sir Joseph Copley, 1st Baronet(died 1781), Clerk of the Signet, of the Copley Baronets
Sir Joseph Copley, 3rd Baronet (c. 1769–1838) of the Copley Baronets
Sir Joseph Copley, 4th Baronet (1804–1883) of the Copley Baronets

See also
Copley (surname)